Dubravnaya (Russian) is a station in the Kazan Metro, a rapid-transit system serving Kazan in the Republic of Tatarstan, Russia. It is the southern terminal of the first line. The station was opened on 30 August 2018.

Kazan Metro